The Maria Canals International Music Competition is a music competition held yearly in the Palau de la Música Catalana, Barcelona. It was founded as a piano competition in 1954, but in 1964 it was expanded so other modalities could be held occasionally.

It was founded in 1954 by the Catalan pianist Maria Remei Canals i Cendrós (1913–2010) and her husband, the composer and writer Rossend Llates (1899–1973).  Since 1954, the Competition has welcomed over 7,000 participants from 100 countries and 180 jury members from all over the world. It became a member of the World Federation of International Music Competitions in 1958.

The Maria Canals competition, for which artists such as Joan Miró, Antoni Tàpies and Joan Clavé have made publicity posters, was declared to be of public utility by the Spanish Interior Ministry in 1996.

Commentaries on the competition 

 Of the multitude of international piano competitions, it is comforting to note that a competition like the Maria Canals at Barcelona, in which the piano is judged purely on a musical level, in which the player cannot forget the essential thing, interpretation, that such a competition takes on greater importance every year. Musicians can only praise and thank Maria Canals for her initiative. For my part, I can only warmly salute not only the longevity of this competition, but its ever more important participation in that magnificent combat in which, nobly and with exemplary probity, the artists of the future – those who will pick up the baton from their elders – face each other. – Vlado Perlemuter, 1964.
 Those of us who follow the Barcelonan musical life can't forget the ascendant evolution of the Maria Canals International Music Competition, initiated in 1954, which has turned into one of the most important European competitions. In celebrating its 40th anniversary we can state that many performers of the highest level have arisen from the competition, such a thing having contributed to expand the prestige of Barcelona as an artistic city. – Xavier Montsalvatge, 2004.

Prize Winners 
{| class="wikitable"
|+ Piano
|-
!1954 !! 1st prize (men) !! 1st prize (women)
|-
|| ||  Miquel Farré Mallofré ||  Maria Neus Miró Gumà
|-
!1956 !! Grand prize !! 1st prize (men) (ex-a.) !! 1st prize (women) (ex-a.)
|-
|| || Not awarded ||  Klaus Börner ||  Aline Demierre
|-
|| || ||  Giorgio Radicula ||  Núria Escofet Manich
|-
!1957 !! Grand prize !! 1st prize (men) !! 1st prize (women)
|-
|| || Not awarded ||  Alberto Colombo ||  Thérèse Castaigne
|-
!1958 !! 1st prize
|-
|| ||  Françoise Thinat
|-
!1959 !! 1st prize !! 2nd prize (men) !! 2nd prize (women)
|-
|| || Not awarded ||  Jean-Jacques Hauser ||  Yoko Ikeda
|-
!1960 !! 1st prize
|-
|| ||  Andrzej Jasiński
|-
!1961 !! 1st prize
|-
|| ||  Catherine Silie
|-
!1962 !! 1st prize
|-
|| ||  Dinorah Varsi
|-
!1963 !! 1st prize !! 2nd prize (men) !! 2nd prize (women)
|-
|| || Not awarded ||  Jerzy Gajek ||  Françoise Parrot
|-
!1964 !! 1st prize
|-
|| ||  Dag Achatz
|-
!1965 !! 1st prize
|-
|| ||  James Tocco
|-
!1966 !! 1st prize
|-
|| ||  Leonora Milà Romeu
|-
!1967 !! 1st prize !! 2nd prize (ex-a.)
|-
|| || Not awarded ||  Franco Angeleri
|-
|| || ||  Jacques Rouvier
|-
!1968 !! 1st prize
|-
|| ||  Christina Viñas
|-
!1969 !! 1st prize
|-
|| ||  Joseph W. Fennimore
|-
!1970 !! 1st prize !! 2nd prize
|-
|| ||  Guadalupe Parrondo ||   Martin Hughes
|-
!1971 !! 1st prize !! 2nd prize (ex-a.)
|-
|| || Not awarded ||  Ewa Bukojemska
|-
|| || ||  Yves Noack
|-
!1972 !! 1st prize
|-
|| ||  Klára Barányi
|-
!1973 !! 1st prize
|-
|| ||  Jonathan M. Purvin
|-
!1974 !! 1st prize !! 2nd prize by unanimity !! 2nd prize (ex-a.)
|-
|| || Not awarded ||  Blanca Bodalla ||  Akira Imai
|-
|| || || ||  Pierre Réach
|-
!1975 !! 1st prize !! 2nd prize (men) (ex-a.) !! 2nd prize (women)
|-
|| || Not awarded ||  Raimondo Campisi ||  Marioaran Trifan
|-
|| || ||  Roberto Capello
|-
|| || ||  Andrea Bonatta
|-
!1976 !! 1st prize !! 2nd prize
|-
|| ||  Yasuto Sugimoto ||  Elza Kolodin
|-
!1977 !! 1st prize !! 2nd prize (ex-a.) !! 3rd prize
|-
|| ||  Arnulf von Arnim ||  Chung-Myung Kim ||  Silvia Natiello
|-
|| || ||  Carmen Or
|-
!1978 !! 1st prize !! 2nd prize !! 3rd prize
|-
|| ||  Bernard d'Ascoli ||  Erik Berchot ||  Ruriko Kikuchi
|-
!1979 !! 1st prize !! 2nd prize (ex-a.) !! 3rd prize
|-
|| || Not awarded ||  Yves Rault||  Mario Bosselli
|-
|| || ||  Christine Kiss
|-
!1980 !! 1st prize !! 2nd prize !! 3rd prize
|-
|| ||  Yuri Rosum ||  Catherine Joly ||  Akos Hernadi
|-
!1981 !! 1st prize !! 2nd prize (ex-a.) !! 3rd prize
|-
|| || Not awarded ||  Kazuoki Fujii ||  José Carlos Cocarelli
|-
|| || ||  Michel Gal ||
|-
!1982 !! 1st prize !! 2nd prize !! 3rd prize
|-
|| ||  Hiromi Okada ||  Karoly Mocsari ||  Yuki Matsuzawa
|-
!1983 !! 1st prize !! 2nd prize (ex-a.) !! 3rd prize !! Special prize
|-
|| || Not awarded ||  Bernd Glemser ||  Antonella Vignali ||  Marcelino López Domínguez
|-
|| || ||  Kyoko Koyama
|-
!1984 !! 1st prize !! 2nd prize (ex-a.) !! 3rd prize
|-
|| ||  Not awarded ||  Rie Konishi ||  Galina Vratcheva
|-
|| || ||  Pascal Le Corre
|-
!1985 !! 1st prize !! 2nd prize (ex-a.) !! 3rd prize
|-
|| || Not awarded ||  Detlef Kaiser ||  Constantin Sandu
|-
|| || ||  Ian Munro
|-
!1986 !! 1st prize !! 2nd prize !! 3rd prize !! Special prize
|-
|| ||  Chiharu Sakai ||  Carole Carniel ||  Nobuyuki Nagaoka ||  Ignacio Marín Bocanegra
|-
!1987 !! 1st prize !! 2nd prize !! 3rd prize (ex-a.)
|-
|| || Not awarded ||  Christopher Oakden ||  Keiko Nakai
|-
|| || || ||  Alexandre Tharaud
|-
!1988 !! 1st prize !! 2nd prize !! 3rd prize !! Special prize
|-
|| ||  Zhong Xu ||  Olivier Cazal ||  Junko Saito ||  José Ramón Méndez Menéndez
|-
!1989 !! 1st prize !! 2nd prize !! 3rd prize !! Special prize
|-
|| ||  Gerardo Vila ||  Christophe Simonet ||  Yukiko Hori ||  Miquel Jorba Picañol
|-
!1990 !! 1st prize !! 2nd prize !! 3rd prize (ex-a.)
|-
|| ||  Mathieu Papadiamandis || Not awarded ||  Jovianney E. Cruz
|-
|| || || ||  Andrei Fadeev
|-
!1991 !! 1st prize !! 2nd prize !! 3rd prize
|-
|| ||  Yuri Martinov ||  Yuko Nakamichi ||  Eva-Maria Rieckert
|-
!1992 !! 1st prize !! 2nd prize !! 3rd prize
|-
|| ||  Armands Ābols ||  Akiko Kato ||  Tomoko Doi
|-
!1993 !! 1st prize !! 2nd prize !! 3rd prize
|-
|| ||  Amir Katz ||  Gustavo Díaz-Jerez ||  Rafal Luszczewski
|-
!1994 !! 1st prize !! 2nd prize !! 3rd prize (ex-a.)
|-
|| ||  Sviatoslav Lips ||  Dmitri Morozov ||  Frederik Lagarde
|-
|| || || ||  Yoko Takemura
|-
!1995 !! 1st prize !! 2nd prize !! 3rd prize (ex-a.)
|-
|| ||  Won Kim ||  Keiji Serizawa ||  Yulia Botchkovskaia
|-
|| || || ||  Birgita Wollenweber
|-
!1996 !! 1st prize !! 2nd prize !! 3rd prize (ex-a.)
|-
|| || Not awarded ||  Jan Gottlieb Jiracek ||  Saar Ahuvia
|-
|| || || ||  Kiyo Wada
|-
!1997 !! 1st prize !! 2nd prize (ex-a.) !! 3rd prize !! Special prize
|-
|| || Not awarded ||  Elina Hata ||  Li Wang ||  Young-Ha Chung
|-
|| || ||  Ayako Kawai
|-
!1998  !! 1st prize !! 2nd prize !! 3rd prize (ex-a.) !! Special prize
|-
|| ||  Peter Koczor ||  Takahiro Mita ||  Miwako Takeda ||  Vincent Larderet
|-
|| || || ||  Anthony Zerpa-Falcon
|-
!1999 !! 1st prize !! 2nd prize !! 3rd prize
|-
|| ||  Kirill Gerstein ||  Ayako Kimura ||  Sung-Hoon Hwang
|-
!2000 !! 1st prize !! 2nd prize !! 3rd prize (ex-a.)
|-
|| ||  Yusuke Kikuchi ||  Ferenc Vizi ||  Piotr Kupka
|-
|| || || ||  Fabrice Lanoë
|-
!2001 !! 1st prize !! 2nd prize (ex-a.) !! 3rd prize
|-
|| ||  Yurie Miura ||  Mel Adkins ||  Mayako Asada
|-
|| || ||  Ekaterina Krivokochenko
|-
!2002 !! 1st prize !! 2nd prize (ex-a.) !! 3rd prize
|-
|| ||  Viv McLean ||  Alexandre Moutouzkine ||  Yun-Yang Lee
|-
|| || ||  Kook Hee Hong
|-
!2003 !! 1st prize !! 2nd prize !! 3rd prize
|-
|| ||   Inesa Synkevich ||  Yosuke Niino ||  Sowon Hwang
|-
!2004 !! 1st prize !! 2nd prize !! 3rd prize
|-
|| ||  Piotr Machnik ||  Yi-Chih Lu ||  Matei Varga
|-
!2005 !! 1st prize !! 2nd prize !! 3rd prize
|-
|| ||  Jue Wang ||  Yukiko Akagi ||  Fumiyo Kawamura
|-
!2006 !! 1st prize !! 2nd prize !! 3rd prize
|-
|| ||  José Enrique Bagaría Villazán ||  Marie Vermeulin ||  Mi-Yeon I
|-
!2007 !! 1st prize !! 2nd prize (ex-a.) !!
|-
|| ||  Mladen Čolić ||  Veronika Böhmova ||  Marisa Gupta
|-
!2008 !! 1st prize !! 2nd prize !! 3rd prize
|-
|| ||  Martina Filjak ||  Ilya Maksimov ||  Jun Ishimura
|-
!2009 !!1st prize !! 2nd prize !! 3rd prize
|-
|| ||  Vestards Šimkus ||  Jong Yun Kim ||  Scipione Sangiovanni
|-
!2010 !!1st prize !! 2nd prize !! 3rd prize
|-
|| ||  Denis Zhdanov ||  Olga Kozlova ||  Marko Hilpo
|-
!2011 !!1st prize !! 2nd prize !! 3rd prize
|-
|| ||  Mateusz Borowiak ||  Alexey Lebedev ||  Alexey Chernov
|-
!2012 !!1st prize !! 2nd prize !! 3rd prize
|-
|| ||  Soo Jung Ann ||  Nozomi Nakagiri ||  Vadym Kholodenko
|-
!2013 !!1st prize !! 2nd prize !! 3rd prize
|-
|| ||   Stanislav Khristenko ||  Tomoaki Yoshida ||  Haejae Kim
|-
!2014 !!1st prize !! 2nd prize !! 3rd prize
|-
|| ||  Regina Chernychko ||  Sergey Belyavskiy ||  Tatiana Chernichka
|-
!2015 !!1st prize !! 2nd prize !! 3rd prize
|-
|| ||  Danylo Saienko ||  Minsung Lee ||  Caterina Grewe
|-
!2016 !!1st prize !! 2nd prize !! 3rd prize
|-
|| ||  Hiroo Sato ||  Shiori Kuwahara ||  Yutong Sun
|-
!2017 !!1st prize !! 2nd prize !! 3rd prize
|-
|| ||  Levon Avagyan ||  Hit Yat Tsang ||  Anastasia Rizikov
|-
!2018 !!1st prize !! 2nd prize !! 3rd prize
|-
|| ||  Evgeny Konnov ||  Luke Jones ||  Alexey Sychev
|-
!2019 !!1st prize !! 2nd prize !! 3rd prize
|-
|| ||  Daumants Liepinš ||  Aleksandr Klyuchko ||  Ka Jeng Wong
|-
|}
2021 -  1st prize - Sandro Gegechkori  (Georgia)    2nd prize -   Ziming Ren     (China)     3rd prize -    Rafael Kyrychenko   (Portugal)

{| class="wikitable"
|+ Chamber Music (1970–87) and Duo-Sonatas (1996 and later)
|-
!1970 !! 1st prize
|-
|| ||  Fernando Puchol and Pedro León
|-
!1973 !! 1st prize!! 2nd prize by unanimity
|-
|| || Not awarded ||  Dieter Lallinger and Jürgen Besig
|-
!1980 !!1st prize !! 2nd prize !! 3rd prize
|-
|| ||  Roland Straumer and Olaf Dressler ||  Izumi Komoriya and Taisuko Yamashita ||  Juan Llinares and  Ludovica Mosca
|-
!1987 !!1st prize !! 2nd prize !! 3rd prize
|-
|| ||  Michael Sanderling and Gerald Fauth ||  Senoko Numata and Akemi Tadenuma ||  Pierre Luc Denuit and Sylvie Barret
|-
!1996 !!1st prize !! 2nd prize !! 3rd prize
|-
|| ||  Avi Downes and Shana Downes ||  Aya Yoshii and Yoko Yoshihara ||  Maria Belousova and  Katarzyna Ewald
|-
!1999 !!1st prize !! 2nd prize !! 3rd prize (ex-a.)
|-
|| ||  Florian Wiek and Justus Grimm ||  Akiko Okabe and Yuko Aragaki ||  Isabel Gabbe and  Leslie Riva
|-
|| || || ||  Kyoko Sasaki and Eriko Iso
|-
!2004 !!1st prize !! 2nd prize !! 3rd prize (ex-a.)
|-
|| ||  Eung Soo Kim and Moon Young Chae ||  Igor Bobowitsch and  Elena Kolesnichenko ||  Julien Beaudiment and Laetitia Bougnol
|-
|| || || ||  Katia Novell and  Luis Parés
|-
|}

{| class="wikitable"
|+ Flute
|-
!1968 !! 1st prize!! 2nd prize (ex-a.)
|-
|| || Not awarded ||  Lô Angelloz
|-
|| || ||  Teresita Frey
|-
!1972 !! 1st prize!! 2nd prize (ex-a.)
|-
|| || Not awarded ||  Christine Turellier
|-
|| || ||  Edelgard Seeman
|-
!1978 !! 1st prize!! 2nd prize (ex-a.)!! 3rd prize
|-
|| || Not awarded ||  Masayoshi Enokida ||  Jadwiga Kotnowska
|-
|| || ||  Philippe Pierlot
|-
!1983 !! 1st prize!! 2nd prize!! 3rd prize!! Special Prize
|-
|| ||  Erika Sebök ||  Motoaki Kato ||  Monika Hegedüs ||  Vicenç Prats
|-
!1988 !! 1st prize!! 2nd prize (ex-a.)!! 3rd prize
|-
|| ||  Dita Krenberga ||  Christel Rayneau ||  Natalia Setchkareva
|-
|| || ||  Iren More
|-
!1994 !! 1st prize!! 2nd prize!! 3rd prize
|-
|| ||  Natalia Danilina ||  Atsuko Koga ||  Maryse Graciet
|-
!1998 !! 1st prize!! 2nd prize!! 3rd prize (ex-a.)
|-
|| ||  Olesia Tertychnaia ||  Christian Farroni ||  Kaori Fujii
|-
|| || || ||  Dejan Gavric
|-
!2001 !! 1st prize!! 2nd prize!! 3rd prize
|-
|| ||  Francesca Canali ||  Hyun-im Yoon  ||  Petra Orgl
|-
|}

{| class="wikitable"
|+ Guitar
|-
!1969 !! 1st prize!! 2nd prize
|-
|| || Not awarded ||  Wolfgang Lendle
|-
!1974 !! 1st prize!! 2nd prize!! 3rd prize
|-
|| ||  Marie Thérèse Ghirardi ||  Dagoberto Linhares ||  Dušan Bogdanović
|-
!1979 !! 1st prize!! 2nd prize!! 3rd prize
|-
|| ||  Leonardo Palacios ||  William Waters ||  Guillermo Pérez
|-
!1981 !! 1st prize!! 2nd prize!! 3rd prize
|-
|| ||  Gabriel García Santos ||  Shin-Ichi Fukuda ||  Nicholas Petrou
|-
!1985 !! 1st prize!! 2nd prize!! 3rd prize
|-
|| ||  Stefano Cardi ||  Han Jonkers ||  Keiko Fujii
|-
!1989 !! 1st prize!! 2nd prize!! 3rd prize
|-
|| ||  Esther-Helena Steenbergen ||  István Römer ||  Vladimir Tervo
|-
!1992 !! 1st prize!! 2nd prize!! 3rd prize
|-
|| ||  George Vassilev ||  Xavier Coll ||  Daisuke Suzuki
|-
!1997 !! 1st prize!! 2nd prize!! 3rd prize
|-
|| ||  Sara Gianfelici ||  Lorenzo Micheli ||  Daekun Jang
|-
|}

{| class="wikitable"
|+ Percussion
|-
!1982 !! 1st prize !! 2nd prize (ex-a.) !! 3rd prize !! Special prize (ex-a.)
|-
|| || Not awarded ||  Axel Fries ||  Shin-ichi Ueno ||  Jordi Mestres
|-
|| || ||  Peter Sadlo || ||  Santiago Molas
|-
!1990 !! 1st prize !! 2nd prize (ex-a.) !! 3rd prize
|-
|| ||  Ramón Alsina ||   Armin Weigert ||  Stefan Eblenkamp
|-
|| || ||  Ignasi Vila ||
|-
|}

{| class="wikitable"
|+ Trio
|-
!2009 !! 1st prize!! 2nd prize!! 3rd prize
|-
|| || Trio Demian || Trio Quintillian || Trio Monte
|-
|}

{| class="wikitable"
|+ Violin
|-
!1964 !! 1st prize
|-
|| ||  Rubén González
|-
!1967 !! 1st prize
|-
|| ||  Edith Volckaert
|-
!1971 !! 1st prize
|-
|| ||  Ernst Kovacic
|-
!1975 !! 1st prize!! 2nd prize
|-
|| men ||  Gerardo Ribeiro ||  Eugen Sârbu
|-
|| women ||  Yukari Tate ||  Rasma Liélmane
|-
!1979 !! 1st prize!! 2nd prize!! 3rd prize
|-
|| || Not awarded ||  Véronique Bogaerts ||  Berthilde Dufour
|-
!1984 !! 1st prize!! 2nd prize!! 3rd prize (ex-a.)!! Special Prize
|-
|| ||  Stéphane L. Picard || Not awarded ||  Danuta Glowacka ||  Joaquín Palomares
|-
|| || || ||  Mark Bleck
|-
!1989 !! 1st prize!! 2nd prize (ex-a.)!! 3rd prize (ex-a.)
|-
|| || Not awarded ||  Franziska Pietsch ||  Thomas Bötcher
|-
|| || ||  Yova Slessareva ||  Kyoko Saburi
|-
!1993 !! 1st prize!! 2nd prize!! 3rd prize
|-
|| ||  Denitsa Kazakova ||  Ryotaro Ito ||  Olga Nodel
|-
|}

{| class="wikitable"
|+ Violoncello
|-
!1976 !! 1st prize!! 2nd prize
|-
|| ||  Daniel Raclot ||  Antônio Meneses
|-
!1986 !! 1st prize!! 2nd prize!! 3rd prize
|-
|| ||  Hillel Zori ||  Luca Signorini || Not awarded
|-
!1991 !! 1st prize!! 2nd prize!! 3rd prize (ex-a.)
|-
|| ||  Valérie Aimard ||  Anita Barbereau ||  Laure Vavasseur
|-
|| || || ||  Thorsten Encke
|-
|}

{| class="wikitable"
|+ Voice
|-
!1965 !! 1st prize!! 2nd prize
|-
|| || Not awarded|| Not awarded
|-
!1966 !! 1st prize
|-
|| ||  Wolfgang Witte
|-
!1967 !! 1st prize
|-
|| ||  Dirk Schortemeier
|-
!1968 !! 1st prize
|-
|| ||  Ionel Pantea
|-
!1969 !! 1st prize!! 2nd prize (ex-a.)
|-
|| || Not awarded ||  Kiyoko Ishii
|-
|| || ||  Roswitha Haub
|-
!1971 !! 1st prize
|-
|| ||  Magdalena Cononovici
|-
!1972 !! 1st prize!! 2nd prize
|-
|| || Not awarded ||  Sandra Sandru
|-
!1973 !! 1st prize
|-
|| ||  Marilena Marinescu
|-
!1974 !! 1st prize!! 2nd prize by unanimity!! 2nd prize (ex-a.)
|-
|| || Not awarded ||  Marius Cosmescu ||  Juliana Paszthy
|-
|| || || ||  Wally Salio
|-
!1975 !! 1st prize!! 2nd prize!! 3rd prize
|-
|| ||  Ludmila Yourchenco ||  Aleksandr Rudkowsky ||  Aleksandr Vorosilo
|-
!1976 !! 1st prize!! 2nd prize!! 3rd prize
|-
|| || Not awarded || Not awarded || Not awarded
|-
!1977 !! 1st prize!! 2nd prize (ex-a.)
|-
|| || Not awarded ||  Károly Szilágyi
|-
|| || ||  Keiko Hibi
|-
!1978 !! 1st prize!! 2nd prize
|-
|| ||  François le Roux ||  Rodica Mitrica
|-
!1979 !! 1st prize!! 2nd prize!! 3rd prize (ex-a.)
|-
|| || Not awarded ||  Eva Tihany ||  Gabriela Mazza
|-
|| || || ||  Kuniko Taguchi
|-
!1981 !! 1st prize!! 2nd prize (ex-a.) !! 3rd prize
|-
|| ||  Nancy Carol Moore ||  Anne Salvan ||  Olim Sadoullaiev
|-
|| || ||  Luis Álvarez Sastre
|-
!1983 !! 1st prize!! 2nd prize!! 3rd prize (ex-a.)
|-
|| ||  Mabel Perelstein ||  Jennifer Larmore ||  Elise Bédard
|-
|| || || ||  Catalina Moncloa
|-
!1985 !! 1st prize!! 2nd prize (ex-a.)!! 3rd prize
|-
|| ||  Chihiro Bamba ||  Tomas Möwes ||  Teresa Verdera
|-
|| || ||  Annette K. Markert
|-
!1987 !! 1st prize!! 2nd prize (ex-a.)!! 3rd prize (ex-a.)
|-
|| || Not awarded ||  Jenny M. Miller ||  Fumi Yamamoto
|-
|| || ||  Jin-Ok Kim ||  Teodor Ciurdea
|-
!1990 !! 1st prize!! 2nd prize!! 3rd prize (ex-a.)!! Special prize
|-
|| ||  Vladimir Dits ||  Mirela S. Spinu ||  Malgorzata Lesiewicz-Przybył ||  Manuel Lanza
|-
|| || || ||  Manuel Lanza
|-
!1995 !! 1st prize!! 2nd prize!! 3rd prize (ex-a.)
|-
|| ||  Mihoko Fujimura ||  Rosa Mateu ||  Hanna Dóra Sturludóttir
|-
|| || || ||  Suki Kim
|-
!2000 !! 1st prize!! 2nd prize (ex-a.)!! 3rd prize
|-
|| ||  Annette Dasch ||  Ramona Eremia || Not awarded
|-
|| || ||  Giedré Povilaityté
|-
|}

References 

Music competitions in Spain
Piano competitions